Jeffrey Catherine Jones (January 10, 1944 – May 19, 2011) was an American artist whose work is best known from the late 1960s through the 2000s. Jones created the cover art for more than 150 books through 1976, as well as venturing into fine art during and after this time. Fantasy artist Frank Frazetta called Jones "the greatest living painter". Although Jones first achieved fame as simply Jeff Jones and later as Jeffrey Jones, she transitioned to female and added Catherine as a middle name in 1998.

Early life
Jeffrey Durwood Jones was born and raised in Atlanta, Georgia. As a child, her father was overseas in the military. She graduated from Georgia State College in 1967 with a degree in geology and was keenly interested in art and admired the work of Johannes Vermeer, Giovanni Battista Tiepolo, and Rembrandt.

Career
Jones moved to New York City to pursue an art career and quickly found work drawing comics pages for King Comics, Gold Key Comics, Creepy, Eerie, and Vampirella, as well as Wally Wood's Witzend. She painted covers for books, including the Ace paperback editions of Fritz Leiber's Fafhrd and the Gray Mouser series and Andre Norton's Postmarked the Stars, The Zero Stone, Uncharted Stars and over 150 others. For a period during the early 1970s, Jones also provided illustrations to Ted White's Fantastic. She drew many covers and short stories for a variety of comics publishers including DC Comics, Skywald Publications, and Warren but generally avoided the superhero genre.

In the 1972–1975 issues of National Lampoon, Jones produced a full page strip entitled Idyl.

The Studio
From 1975 to 1979 Jones shared a workspace in Manhattan's Chelsea district with Bernie Wrightson, Barry Windsor-Smith, and Michael Kaluta, collectively named The Studio. Dragon's Dream produced a volume of their work in 1979. Industry journalist Tom Spurgeon commented on the broader significance and influence of The Studio in his obituary of Jones at The Comics Reporter:

By the early 1980s she had a recurring strip in Heavy Metal titled I'm Age. Cartoonists Walter Simonson and J. D. King said at the time that Jones had a growing interest in expressionism and did not pursue comic work as closely thereafter.

Personal life
In 1964, while attending Georgia State College, Jones met fellow student Mary Louise Alexander (later notable as writer Louise Simonson). The two began dating and married in 1966. Their daughter Julianna was born the following year. After graduation, the couple moved to New York City but divorced in the early 1970s.

Gender transition
As an adult, Jones recalled wanting to be a girl from her earliest memories. She confronted these issues in 1998 and began hormone replacement therapy. Comics writer and journalist Steven Ringgenberg elaborated on the transition in an obituary/tribute to Jones at The Comics Journal:

Death
Jones' personal Facebook page reported following her death: "Legendary fantasy artist Jeffrey Catherine Jones passed away today, Thursday, May 19, 2011, at 4:00 am surrounded by family. Jeffrey suffered from severe emphysema and bronchitis as well as hardening of the arteries around the heart..."

Awards
In 1967, Jones was nominated for the Hugo Award for Best Fan Artist; she was also nominated for the Hugo Award for Best Professional Artist in 1970, 1971, and 1972. In 1975 she was nominated for the World Fantasy Award—Artist, and won it in 1986.  Additionally, Jones was nominated for the Chesley Award in 1999.

Films
In 2012 a film retrospective on DVD by Maria P. Cabardo was released by Indiegogo featuring interviews with friends, fellow artists, and the artist herself titled Better Things: The Life and Choices of Jeffrey Catherine Jones.

Bibliography

Books
 Age of Innocence: The Romantic Art of Jeffrey Jones 39 pages, Underwood Books, August 1994, 
 The Art of Jeffrey Jones 160 pages, Underwood Books, October 2002, 
 Jeffrey Jones Sketchbook 107 pages, Vanguard Productions, April 2007, 
 Absolute Death includes "A Winter's Tale" a six-page short story written by Neil Gaiman and drawn by Jones, 360 pages, DC Comics, October 2009, 
 Jeffrey Jones: A Life in Art 256 pages, IDW Publishing, January 2011, 
 Jeffrey Jones: The Definitive Reference 178 pages, Vanguard Productions, May 2013,

Comics

Charlton Comics
 Charlton Bullseye #1 (1975)
 Flash Gordon #13 (1969)

DC Comics
 The Dark Mansion of Forbidden Love #3 (cover) (1972)
 Heroes Against Hunger #1 (1986)
 Showcase #83–84 (Nightmaster) (1969)
 Vertigo: Winter's Edge #2 (1999)
 The Witching Hour #14 (1971)
 Wonder Woman #199–200 (covers) (1972)

Fantagraphics Books
 Jones Touch #1 (1993)
 Vaughn Bodē's Erotica #2 (introduction) (1996)

Gold Key Comics
 Boris Karloff Tales of Mystery #21 (1968)

HM Communications, Inc.
 Heavy Metal #v4 #2, 11; #v5 #3–4, 6–12; #v6 #2–12; #v7 #1–12 #v8 #1–4; #v11 #2 (1981–1987)

Last Gasp
 Spasm #1 (1973)

Marvel Comics
 Conan Saga #31 (1989)
 Epic Illustrated #10, 19, 25, 30 (1982–1985)
 Heroes for Hope Starring The X-Men #1 (1985)
 Savage Sword of Conan #5 (1975)

NL Communications, Inc
 National Lampoon #v1 #28, 35, 38–39, 46–52, 54, 56–60 (1972–1975)

Pacific Comics
 Alien Worlds #4 (1983)
 Berni Wrightson: Master of the Macabre #4 (1984)
 Pathways to Fantasy #1 (1984)
 Ravens and Rainbows #1 (1983)

Renaissance Press
 The Forbidden Book #1 (2001)

Skywald Publications
 Nightmare #6–7 (covers), 21 (1971–1974)
 Psycho #5–6, 9, 12 (1971–1973)

Spiderbaby Grafix
 Taboo #5 (1991)

Topps Comics
 Jurassic Park tpb (1993)

TwoMorrows Publishing
 Streetwise #1 (2000)

Warren Publishing
 Comix International #3 (1975)
 Creepy #16, 29, 91, 103, 120 (1967–1980)
 Eerie #11–12, 15, 27 (1967–1970)
 Vampirella #4–5, 9, 12, 27, 32–34, 50, 83 (1970–1979)

References

External links

Tribute Woman in the Man, Jones tribute by Michael Netzer, May 20, 2011

1944 births
2011 deaths
20th-century American painters
20th-century American women artists
American comics artists
American female comics artists
American speculative fiction artists
American women painters
Artists from Atlanta
Deaths from arteriosclerosis
Deaths from emphysema
Fantasy artists
American LGBT artists
LGBT comics creators
LGBT people from Georgia (U.S. state)
Place of death missing
Savannah State University alumni
Science fiction artists
Transgender artists
Transgender women
World Fantasy Award-winning artists
21st-century American painters
21st-century American women